This is a list of North Dakota suffragists, suffrage groups and others associated with the cause of women's suffrage in North Dakota.

Groups 

 Beach Votes for Women League.
Grand Forks Equal Suffrage Association.
National Woman's Party.
Votes for Women Club of Grand Forks, created on March 1, 1912.
 Votes for Women League, created in 1912.
Woman Suffrage League of Bismarck, created in 1914.
Woman's Christian Temperance Union.

Suffragists 

 Beulah Amindon (Fargo).
 Elizabeth Preston Anderson.
Marie Louise Bottineau Baldwin (Metis/Turtle Mountain Chippewa) (Pembina).
Helen M. Barker.
 Emma Bates (Bismarck, Valley City).
 Grace Clendenning (Wimbeldon).
Louisa A. Conger (Dickinson).
Guy C. H. Corliss.
Clara L. Darrow (Fargo).
Helen deLendrecie (Fargo).
 Cora Smith Eaton (Grand Forks).
Annie Falger (Devil's Lake).
Janette Hill Knox (Wahpeton).
Alma Lutz (Jamestown).
Emma Murray (Hebron).
Flora Blackman Naylor (Chautauqua).
Elizabeth Darrow O'Neil (Fargo).
Alice Nelson Page (Grand Forks).
Kate Perkins.
Alice M. Alt Pickler.
Christine Pollock (Fargo).
Helen G. Putnam.
Fannie D. Quain (Bismarck).
 Linda Slaughter (Bismarck).
Mazie Stevens (Grand Forks).
Mary Darrow Weible (Fargo).
Kate Selby Wilder (Fargo).

Politicians supporting women's suffrage 

 John Cashel.
Oscar Lindstrom.
John Pickler.
Robert M. Pollock.
Enos Stutsman.

Suffragists campaigning in North Dakota 

 Henry Browne Blackwell.
Lillie Devereux Blake.
Carrie Chapman Catt.
Emma Smith DeVoe.
Susan S. Fessenden.
Ella M. S. Marble.
Helen Guthrie Miller.
Sylvia Pankhurst.
Anna Howard Shaw.

Anti-suffragists in North Dakota 
Groups
North Dakota Association Opposed to Woman Suffrage, organized in Fargo in 1914.
Personal Liberty League of the German American Alliance.
People

 Ida Clarke Young.

See also 

 Timeline of women's suffrage in North Dakota
 Women's suffrage in North Dakota
 Women's suffrage in states of the United States
 Women's suffrage in the United States

References

Sources 

 

North Dakota suffrage

North Dakota suffragists
Activists from North Dakota
History of North Dakota
Suffragists